The Four Seasons is a 1981 American romantic comedy film written and directed by and starring Alan Alda, which co-stars Carol Burnett, Len Cariou, Sandy Dennis, Rita Moreno, Jack Weston, and Bess Armstrong. It draws its title from the four concerti composed by Antonio Vivaldi. Those compositions, along with others by Vivaldi, comprise the musical score.

The film spawned a short-lived CBS series in 1984 produced by Alda.

Plot summary
The story revolves around three upper middle-class married couples living in New York City who take vacations together during each of the seasons. After this pattern has been established, Nick leaves his wife of 21 years, Anne, during the spring trip to Nick and Anne's country house. He then proceeds to bring Ginny, a much younger woman, on the summer, fall, and winter vacation trips. This causes the other two couples to be uncomfortable, feeling as if they have betrayed their good friend Anne.

Characters
Jack Burroughs (Alan Alda). Jack is a lawyer and happily married to Kate. He enjoys asking deep and probing questions and then volunteering an answer. Jack is moralistic, expressing disapproval of Nick for leaving his wife. He competes with the more athletic Nick in dirtbike racing, soccer, and skiing. His friends and wife consider him too judgmental at times. Instead of keeping true feelings to themselves, Jack thinks it's better for everyone to clear the air, when some feelings could be better off hidden.
Kate Burroughs (Carol Burnett). Kate works as an editor for Fortune magazine. She suspects that her husband has fantasies of being worshipped by an attractive, younger woman the way Nick has. Since she comes across as well-organized and even perfect, Kate can feel invisible and neglected.
Nick Callan (Len Cariou). Nick is an insurance salesman and estate planner. He is bored with his wife Anne and divorces her. He admits to Jack that he wants a woman who can excite him. Ginny, a younger woman, begins joining him on seasonal vacations with the Burroughses and Zimmers. Although his four friends disapprove, Nick is happy. Ginny marries him and becomes pregnant with his child.
Danny Zimmer (Jack Weston). Danny is a dentist and married to Claudia. He shares with his male friends a passion for cooking and exotic dishes. He is oldest of the group and fears that he is approaching death. This has prompted diet changes and even irrational fears, like pressing strange elevator buttons. Danny can be quite cheap when it comes to money and often displays symptoms of obsessive-compulsive disorder.
Claudia Zimmer (Rita Moreno). Claudia is an accomplished painter. She can be quite outspoken, even to the point of being insensitive to others. Whenever her candor is criticized, Claudia refuses to apologize and cites her heritage ("I'm Italian!"). She expresses the desire to feel in love the way Nick does with Ginny. After witnessing Nick and Ginny swim naked, Claudia and Danny try it themselves.
Anne Callan (Sandy Dennis). Anne is a housewife, mother, and aspiring photographer. She takes pleasure in taking photos of vegetables, much to Nick's chagrin. After being left for a younger woman, Anne falls into depression. She believes that both Kate and Claudia deserted her following her divorce. To break out of her rut, Anne attempts to try new (but unusual) things such as buying a snake and planning a vacation to Czechoslovakia. Eventually she is able to support herself as a magazine photographer (taking "pictures of people, not kumquats," as Nick observes).
Ginny Newley (Bess Armstrong). Ginny begins a relationship with Nick after meeting him on a flight. She is attractive, bubbly, and a bit naive. She is in awe of the older Nick, whom she regards as quite accomplished. Although the Burroughses and Zimmers resent her as "the other woman," they eventually accept her as a friend. Ginny defends Danny when the group mocks him for his irrational fears. Ginny marries Nick and she becomes pregnant with his child.
Beth Burroughs (Elizabeth Alda). Beth is the daughter of Jack and Kate. She attends college at the University of Vermont and is an excellent student. Noting her upbeat attitude, Danny observes that she "takes a real bite out of life." Beth's relationship with Lisa, a classmate, has deteriorated at college.
Lisa Callan (Beatrice Alda). Lisa is the daughter of Nick and Anne. Her parents' divorce greatly affected her and caused her to become sullen, withdrawn, and isolated at school. Lisa confesses her unhappiness to her father, who is unable to cheer her up.

Release
The film had its premiere at the Denver International Film Festival on April 30, 1981 before opening May 22.

Reception
The Four Seasons was a critical and box office success. Produced on a budget of $6.5 million, the film grossed $50,427,646, making it the ninth highest-grossing film of 1981. It holds a 76% "Fresh" rating on the review aggregate website Rotten Tomatoes from 17 reviews.

The film also renewed interest in the Vivaldi concerti after which it was named and which its musical score included.

Awards and nominations

References

External links
 
 
 
 
 

1981 films
1981 comedy-drama films
1981 directorial debut films
1980s romantic comedy-drama films
American romantic comedy-drama films
Films about marriage
Films about vacationing
Films directed by Alan Alda
Films produced by Martin Bregman
Films set in Connecticut
Films set in New York City
Films set in the Caribbean
Films shot in Georgia (U.S. state)
Films shot in New York City
Films shot in the United States Virgin Islands
Films shot in Vermont
Films shot in Virginia
Films with screenplays by Alan Alda
Midlife crisis films
Universal Pictures films
Films set in country houses
1980s English-language films
1980s American films